Thomas David Barber (born 18 November 1937) is a former English cricketer. Barber was a right-handed batsman who bowled right-arm off break. He was born at Carlton in Lindrick, Nottinghamshire.

Barber made a single first-class appearance for Nottinghamshire against Cambridge University in 1960 at Fenner's. Barber made scores of 3 in Nottinghamshire's first-innings before he was dismissed by Alan Hurd, while in their second-innings he was dismissed for a duck by David Kirby. His only first-class appearance for Nottinghamshire ended in a 161 runs defeat. Just after a month later he made a further appearance in first-class cricket, this time for the Free Foresters against Cambridge University at Fenner's. He ended the Free Foresters first-innings not out on 2, while he wasn't required to bat in their second-innings, with the Free Foresters winnings by 5 wickets.

His great-uncle William Barber was also a first-class cricketer.

References

External links
David Barber at ESPNcricinfo
David Barber at CricketArchive

1937 births
Living people
People from Carlton in Lindrick
Cricketers from Nottinghamshire
English cricketers
Nottinghamshire cricketers
Free Foresters cricketers